Frederick Bakewell (1824 - 31 October 1881) was a surveyor and architect based in Nottingham.

History
He was born in 1824 in Stone in Staffordshire, the son of Thomas and Sarah Bakewell. He started practice in Nottingham in Thurland Street in the late 1850s.

In 1874 he entered into partnership with his nephew Albert Nelson Bromley who had formerly been his pupil. He retired in 1876 when the partnership was dissolved and lived in The Elms, Beeston in Nottingham and also in Lincoln until his death in Norwich on 31 October 1881. He left an estate valued at £586 11s. 5d.

Works
Nottingham School of Art 1863-65 (now Waverley Building, Nottingham Trent University)
St Luke’s Church, Schools, Carlton Road, Nottingham 1864.
Vicarage, St Saviour’s Church, Nottingham 1867 
Mill for Smedley at Sandiacre, Derbyshire ca. 1869 
Market Hall, Stone, Staffordshire 1869-70
Lenton Industrial and Provident Society, Stanford Street, Nottingham 1873
Sutton Mill, Mansfield 1873 (alterations)
Huntingdon Street Board School 1874 (with Albert Nelson Bromley)
Victoria Buildings, Bath Street, Nottingham 1876-77 (with Albert Nelson Bromley. Now Park View Court )
St John the Evangelist’s Church, Hucknall 1876-77 (with Albert Nelson Bromley)

References

19th-century English architects
Architects from Nottingham
People from Stone, Staffordshire
1824 births
1881 deaths